Hans-Joachim Reich (18 April 1930 – 16 January 2016) was a German swimmer. He competed in two events at the 1956 Summer Olympics.

References

1930 births
2016 deaths
German male swimmers
Olympic swimmers of the United Team of Germany
Swimmers at the 1956 Summer Olympics
Place of birth missing